Eugen Haas was a Swiss footballer who played for FC Basel in their 1923–24 season. He played as a forward.

In that season Haas played 18 games for Basel and scored twice; 12 of the games were in the Swiss Serie A and six were friendly games. He scored both his goals during the friendly games. Haas made his domestic league debut for the club in the away game on 30 September 1923 as Basel were defeated 2–1 by Nordstern Basel.

References

Sources
 Rotblau: Jahrbuch Saison 2017/2018. Publisher: FC Basel Marketing AG. 
 Die ersten 125 Jahre. Publisher: Josef Zindel im Friedrich Reinhardt Verlag, Basel. 
 Verein "Basler Fussballarchiv" Homepage

FC Basel players
Swiss men's footballers
Association football forwards